Emergency service response codes are predefined systems used by emergency services to describe the priority and response assigned to calls for service. Response codes vary from country to country, jurisdiction to jurisdiction, and even agency to agency, with different methods used to categorize responses to reported events.

United States
In the United States, response codes are used to describe a mode of response for an emergency unit responding to a call. They generally vary but often have three basic tiers:

 Code 1: Respond to the call without using emergency lights and sirens.
 Code 2: Respond to the call with emergency lights, but without sirens. Alternatively, sirens may be used if necessary, such as to make traffic yield or when going through intersections.
 Code 3: Respond to the call with emergency lights and sirens.

The term "Code 4" is also occasionally considered a response code, though it generally only means "call has been handled or resolved, no further units respond".

Certain agencies may add or remove certain codes. For example, in the Los Angeles Police Department's radio procedures, Code 1 is not a response code, and its meaning is transferred to Code 2, the original meaning of which is transferred to the semi-official response code "Code 2-High". Additionally, some agencies use "Code 99" or a derivative, which typically designates a major emergency of the highest priority. Some agencies also use their own response codes; for example, Code 3 may be called a Hot Response, and Code 1 may be called a Cold Response. Some slang may be derived from these, such as "running hot" or "running cold".

Some agencies may use the terms "upgrade" and "downgrade" to denote an increase or decrease in priority. For example, if a police unit is conducting a Code 1 response to an argument, and the dispatcher reports that the argument has escalated to a fight, the unit may report an "upgrade" to a Code 3 response. The term downgrade may be used in the opposite situation.

A similar variation, generally used by units instead of dispatchers, is to "increase code" and "reduce code". For example, if multiple units are responding Code 3 to a call, but the units already at the scene have mostly resolved the situation, the scene units may request that the responding units "reduce code". In this example, to "reduce code" would mean to continue responding, but at Code 2 or Code 1, rather than discontinue altogether.

Some emergency medical services use "Priority" instead:

Priority 1: Dead on arrival Trauma/CPR
Priority 2: Emergency
Priority 3: Non-Emergency
Priority 4: Situation Under Control
Priority 5: Mass-casualty incident

Possible shift to plain language
The National Incident Management System (NIMS) states "it is required that plain language be used for multi-agency, multi-jurisdiction and multi-discipline events, such as major disasters and exercises", and federal grants became contingent on this beginning fiscal year 2006. NIMS also strongly encourages the use of plain language for internal use within a single agency.

United Kingdom

The use of lights and sirens is up to the individual police officer driving to the call. The nature of the call is an aggravating factor when deciding when to use them. Calls are graded by either the control room direct (in the case of emergency calls) or by some sort of first contact centre (nonemergency calls). Grading is affected by such factors as the use or threat of violence at the incident being reported. Even though the grading is done by the control room, officers can request an incident be upgraded if they feel in their judgement they are needed immediately. They can also request to downgrade an incident if they feel they cannot justify using emergency equipment like blue lights and sirens.

There is no nationally agreed call grading system with a number of different systems being used across the UK and attendance times given the grade varies between forces, depending on how rural the county is. For example, Suffolk Constabulary break down Grade A emergencies into further sub-categories of Grade A Urban and Rural, with Urban attendance times attracting a 15-minute arrival time and Grade A Rural attendance would attract a 20-minute arrival time. Some of these are listed below but is not exhaustive.

Another variant in use within the UK.

A numerical grading system is used in some forces.

Ambulance responses in the UK are as follows. Some ambulance services allow driver discretion for Category 3/4 calls; this may be dependent on the type of call or how long it has been waiting for a response for. 999 calls to the ambulance service are triaged using either the NHS Pathways system or the Medical Priority Dispatch System.

The use of flashing lights and sirens is colloquially known as blues and twos, which refers to the blue lights and the two-tone siren once commonplace (although most sirens now use a range of tones). In the UK, only blue lights are used to denote emergency vehicles (although other colours may be used as sidelights, stop indicators, etc.). A call requiring the use of lights and sirens is often colloquially known as a blue light run.

Australia 

 

Code 1: A time critical case with a lights and sirens ambulance response. An example is a cardiac arrest or serious traffic accident.

Code 2: An acute but non-time critical response. The ambulance does not use lights and sirens to respond. An example of this response code is a broken leg.

Code 3: A non-urgent routine case. These include cases such as a person with ongoing back pain but no recent injury.

Source

Additional codes are used for internal purposes.

Country Fire Authority
There are two types of response for the Country Fire Authority which cover the outer Melbourne Area. These are similar to those used by Ambulance Victoria, minus the use of Code 2.

Code 1: A time critical event with response requiring lights and siren. This usually is a known and going fire or a rescue incident.

Code 2: Unused within the Country Fire Authority

Code 3: Non-urgent event, such as a previously extinguished fire or community service cases (such as animal rescue or changing of smoke alarm batteries for the elderly).

New South Wales 

Marine Rescue NSW

Code 1 Urgent Response - Use warning devices

Code 2 Semi Urgent Response - Use of Warning devices at skippers discretion

Code 3 Non Urgent Response - Warning Devices not needed

Code 4 Training - No Warning devices to be used unless specifically needed for training

The New South Wales Rural Fire Service and the New South Wales State Emergency Service use two levels of response, depending on what the call-out is and what has been directed of the crew attending the incident by orders of the duty officer:

Proceed: To drive to an incident, without displaying lights and/or sirens and to obey all road rules.
Respond: To drive to an incident, urgently but safely, whilst displaying lights and/or sirens. Drivers are exempt from the road traffic act with some conditions, however both organisations have policies imposing further restrictions. The siren can be switched off at the discretion of the driver when it is not needed (for example, when the road ahead is clear of traffic and easily visible) and reactivated at possible traffic hazards.

The New South Wales Police Force uses two distinct classifications for responding to incidents. In order to respond 'code red' a driver must be suitably trained and have qualified in appropriate police driver training courses.

 Code Red: Vehicle responding with lights and sirens activated.
 Code Blue: Vehicle responding without lights or sirens activated.

South Australia 
SA Ambulance Service use a Priority system.

Note: Priorities 0 and 3 have been reserved for future use. Priority 9 is used for administration taskings.

The South Australian Metropolitan Fire Service, Country Fire Service and South Australian State Emergency Service use a Priority System which has been recently updated.

All calls are routed through the Metropolitan Fire Service (Call Sign "Adelaide Fire") including State Emergency Service 132 500 calls.

During significant weather events the State Communication Centre (SCC) unit of the SES take over call taking responsibly. This operations centre is manned by volunteers routing calls for assistance to the closest unit who will dispatch the events to individual teams.

Queensland 
Queensland Police uses the priority system:
 Code 1 - Immediate risk of death to a person. Proceed lights and sirens. Permission granted to disobey road rules.
 Code 2 - Immediate risk of serious injury to a person or damage to property. Proceed lights and sirens. Permission granted to disobey road rules.
 Code 3 - Routine job. Proceed without lights or siren. Road rules must be obeyed.
 Code 4 - Negotiated response time. Proceed without lights or siren. Road rules must be obeyed.

For Queensland Police code 1 and code 2 are exactly the same response time. Rarely will a job be given a priority code 1, instead officers will (in most cases) be told to respond code 2.

Northern Territory 
St John Ambulance Northern Territory uses terms to determine the response:
 Emergency or Non-Emergency. Emergency can be broken down into Life-threatening or Non-life-threatening.
 Emergency: Life-threatening - Respond lights and sirens
 Emergency:Non-life-threatening - Respond without lights and sirens
 Non Emergency: Respond without lights and sirens

Western Australia 
St John Ambulance Western Australia uses the following codes to determine a response:
 Priority 0 represents an Emergency call when there's an immediate threat to life, such as an incident requiring resuscitation.
 Priority 1 represents an Emergency call. (Response time target is to attend to 90% of emergency calls within 15 minutes)
 Priority 2 represents an Urgent call. Use of lights authorised and siren allowed only when passing through heavy traffic and clearing intersections. (Response time target is to attend to 90% of urgent calls within 25 minutes)
 Priority 3 represents a Non-urgent call. (response time target is to attend to 90% of non-urgent calls within 60 minutes)  ..

The Western Australian Police uses the following codes from 1 to 7 to determine response actions:
 Priority 1 is an emergency call. Lights and siren authorised. An example of a Priority 1 call would be an armed holdup call, or an officer down.
 Priority 2 is a less urgent emergency call. Lights and siren authorised, but follow basic traffic rules. An example of a Priority 2 call is a serious shots fired or officer in trouble/officer requires urgent assistance
 Priority 3 is an urgent call, lights and siren authorised, but follow basic traffic and road rules.
 Priority 4 is a less urgent call. Lights and siren authorised but follow more advanced traffic rules and the speed limit.
 Priority 5, 6, and 7 is a standard call. No lights or siren authorised and follow all traffic rules.

The Department of Fire and Emergency Services have two response codes:
 Fire Call is the response that authorises lights and sirens, and disobeying road laws within reason. This is the response for most calls, including bushfires and road crashes.
 Normal Road is the second response that requires the appliance to follow road regulations and not use emergency lights and siren. This code is rarely used for initial responders, but is given to further appliances if the incident doesn't require immediate assistance. This is also the only code that the State Emergency Services are authorised to respond with.

See also
 Medical Priority Dispatch System
 Police code
 Ten-code

References

Response Codes